is a Japanese drama film, produced in 2014, directed by Nobuhiko Obayashi. The film stars Tōru Shinagawa, Takako Tokiwa, Tokie Hidari, Takehiro Murata, Yutaka Matsushige, Shunsuke Kubozuka, Saki Terashima and Hirona Yamazaki. The screenplay by Obayashi and Tadashi Naito was based on the story by Koji Hasegawa.  The residents of the small northern town of Ashibetsu, where the film was set, helped fund the film.

Plot 
The film examines such issues as Japan's wartime responsibility, the current nuclear fallout issue, and romance. The director, Nobuhiko Obayashi, has referred to the film as "Guernica in moving images." The film's story follows the funeral of Mitsuo Suzuki, played by Toru Shinagawa, where the family, including his sister Eiko (Tokie Hidari); grandchildren Fuyuki (Takehiro Murata), Haruhiko (Yutaka Matsushige), Akito (Shunsuke Kubozuka), Kanna (Saki Terashima); and his great-granddaughter Kasane (Hirona Yamazaki) all meet to discuss his death. Much of the film focuses on flashbacks to Suzuki's youth, and covers the history of the town of Ashibetsu during the 1930s. The film crisscrosses the stories of a dozen different characters, from different decades.

Cast 
The film stars 
 Tōru Shinagawa 
 Takako Tokiwa
 Tokie Hidari
 Takehiro Murata
 Yutaka Matsushige
 Shunsuke Kubozuka
 Saki Terashima
 Hirona Yamazaki.

Production 
The residents of the small northern town of Ashibetsu, where the film was set, helped fund the film, which resulted in the film having a small budget.

References

External links 
 

2014 drama films
2014 films
Films based on Japanese novels
Japanese drama films
Films directed by Nobuhiko Obayashi
Films scored by Kousuke Yamashita
2010s Japanese films